Alfred Avery Burnham (March 8, 1819 – April 11, 1879) was an American politician who served as a U.S. Representative from Connecticut and as Lieutenant Governor of Connecticut.

Biography 
Born in Windham, Connecticut, Burnham completed a preparatory course and attended college for one year before studying law.  He was admitted to the bar in 1843 and commenced practice in Windham.  He served as member of the Connecticut House of Representatives in 1844, 1845, 1850, and 1858, serving as speaker in 1858.  He served as clerk of the Connecticut Senate in 1847, and was the 48th Lieutenant Governor of Connecticut in 1857.

Burnham was elected as a Republican to the Thirty-sixth and Thirty-seventh Congresses (March 4, 1859 – March 3, 1863).  He was not a candidate for renomination in 1862.  He was again a member of the Connecticut House of Representatives in 1870 and served again as speaker.  He died in Windham, Connecticut, on April 11, 1879.  He was interred in Windham Cemetery, Windham Center, Connecticut.

References

1819 births
1879 deaths
People from Windham, Connecticut
Republican Party members of the United States House of Representatives from Connecticut
Lieutenant Governors of Connecticut
Republican Party Connecticut state senators
Speakers of the Connecticut House of Representatives
Connecticut lawyers
19th-century American politicians
Burials at Windham Cemetery
19th-century American lawyers